Lars Gunnarsen is a Danish professor in construction at Aalborg University where he conducts research in indoor climate and ventilation.

Education 
Lars Gunnarsen graduated as Master in Mechanical Engineering from the Danish Technical University in 1984. In 1989 he was awarded the PhD degree.

References

External links
Lars Gunnarsen at Google Scholar

Living people
Academic staff of Aalborg University
Technical University of Denmark alumni
Year of birth missing (living people)